Roasting is a cooking method that uses dry heat where hot air covers the food, cooking it evenly on all sides with temperatures of at least  from an open flame, oven, or other heat source. Roasting can enhance the flavor through caramelization and Maillard browning on the surface of the food. Roasting uses indirect, diffused heat (as in an oven), and is suitable for slower cooking of meat in a larger, whole piece. Meats and most root and bulb vegetables can be roasted. Any piece of meat, especially red meat, that has been cooked in this fashion is called a roast. Meats and vegetables prepared in this way are described as "roasted", e.g., roasted chicken or roasted squash.

Methods

For roasting, the food may be placed on a rack, in a roasting pan or, to ensure even application of heat, may be rotated on a spit or rotisserie. If a pan is used, the juice can be retained for use in gravy, Yorkshire pudding, etc. During oven roasting, hot air circulates around the meat, cooking all sides evenly. There are several plans for roasting meat: low-temperature cooking, high-temperature cooking, and a combination of both. Each method can be suitable, depending on the food and the tastes of the people.
 A low-temperature oven, is best when cooking with large cuts of meat, turkey and whole chickens. This is not technically roasting temperature, but it is called slow-roasting. The benefit of slow-roasting an item is less moisture loss and a more tender product. More of the collagen that makes meat tough is dissolved in slow cooking. At true roasting temperatures,  or more, the water inside the muscle is lost at a high rate.
 Cooking at high temperatures is beneficial if the cut is tender enough—as in filet mignon or strip loin—to be finished cooking before the juices escape. A reason for high temperature roasting is to brown the outside of the food, similar to browning food in a pan before pot roasting or stewing it. Fast cooking gives more variety of flavor, because the outside is brown while the center is much less done.
 The combination method uses high heat just at either the beginning or the end of the cooking process, with most of the cooking at a low temperature. This method produces the golden-brown texture and crust, but maintains more of the moisture than simply cooking at a high temperature, although the product will not be as moist as low-temperature cooking the whole time. Searing and then turning down to low is also beneficial when a dark crust and caramelized flavor is desired for the finished product.

In general, in either case, the meat is removed from the heat before it has finished cooking and left to sit for a few minutes, while the inside cooks further from the residual heat content, known as carry over cooking.

The objective in any case is to retain as much moisture as possible, while providing the texture and color. As meat cooks, the structure and especially the collagen breaks down, allowing juice to come out of the meat. So meat is juiciest at about medium rare while the juice is coming out. During roasting, meats and vegetables are frequently basted on the surface with butter, lard, or oil to reduce the loss of moisture by evaporation. In recent times, plastic oven bags have become popular for roasts. These cut cooking times and reduce the loss of moisture during roasting, but reduce flavor development from Maillard browning, somewhat more like (boiled or steamed) stew or pot roast. They are particularly popular for turkeys.

Until the late 19th century, roasting by dry heat in an oven was called baking. Roasting originally meant cooking meat or a bird on or in front of a fire, as with a grill or spit. It is one of the oldest forms of cooking known.

Traditionally recognized roasting methods consist only of baking and cooking over or near an open fire. Grilling is normally not technically a roast, since a grill (gridiron) is used. Barbecuing and smoking differ from roasting because of the lower temperature and controlled smoke application. Grilling can be considered as a low-fat food preparation, as it allows any fat in the food to drip away.

Meat 

Before the invention and widespread use of stoves, food was primarily cooked over open flames from a hearth. To roast meat, racks with skewers, or, if accessible, complicated gear arrangements, would be utilized to turn the piece(s). In the past, this method was often associated with the upper class and special occasions, rather than customary mealtimes, because it required freshly killed meat and close attention during cooking. It was easy to ruin the meat’s taste with a smoky fire or negligence to rotate it at regular intervals. Thus, elite families, who were able to afford quality meat, appointed this task to servants or invested in technology like automatic turning devices. With further technological advances, cooking came to accommodate new opportunities. By the 1860s, working families were able to afford low-priced stove models that became sufficiently available. However, the key element of observation during roasting became difficult and dangerous to do with the coal oven. Hence, traditional roasting disappeared as kitchens became no longer equipped for this custom and soon thereafter, "baking" came to be "roasting".

Roasting can be applied to a wide variety of meat. In general, it works best for cooking whole chickens, turkey, and leaner cuts of lamb, pork, and beef. The aim is to highlight the flavor of the meat itself rather than a sauce or stew, as it is done in braising or other moist-heat methods. Many roasts are tied with string prior to roasting, often using the reef knot or the packer's knot. Tying holds them together during roasting, keeping any stuffing inside, and keeps the roast in a round profile, which promotes even cooking.

Red meats such as beef, lamb, and venison, and certain game birds are often roasted to be "medium rare" "rare", meaning that the center of the roast is still red. Roasting is a preferred method of cooking for most poultry, and certain cuts of beef, pork, or lamb. Although there is a growing fashion in some restaurants to serve "rose pork", temperature monitoring of the center of the roast is the only sure way to avoid foodborne disease.

In Britain, Ireland, and Australia, a roast of meat may be referred to as a joint, or a leg, if it is a leg.

Vegetables 

Some vegetables, such as potatoes, carrots, eggplants/aubergines, zucchini/courgette, pumpkin, turnips, rutabagas/swedes, parsnips, cauliflower, asparagus, squash,  peppers, yam and plantain lend themselves to roasting as well. Roasted chestnuts are also a popular snack in winter.

Fish 
Roasting fish is done with whole fish, and will work well with snapper, or any medium-sized, whole round fish such as trout, ocean perch and black sea bass will work.

Traybake 
In the United States and Britain, a mix of vegetables and meat roasted together in the same pan are known as a traybake.

Gallery

See also 

 Asado
 Braising or pot roasting
 Coffee roasting
 Dry roasting
 Hendl (roasted chicken)
 Low-temperature cooking
 Pan frying
 Polycyclic aromatic hydrocarbons
 Roast beef
 Roasting pan

References

External links

Cooking techniques
Culinary terminology